"The Fields of Athenry" is a song written in 1979 by Pete St. John in the style of an  Irish folk ballad.  Set during the Great Famine of the 1840s, the lyrics feature a fictional man from near Athenry in County Galway, who stole food for his starving family and has been sentenced to transportation to the Australian penal colony at Botany Bay. It has become a widely known, popular anthem for Irish sports supporters.

History
"The Fields of Athenry" was written in 1979 by Pete St. John, who stated he heard a story about a young man from the Athenry area who had been caught stealing corn to feed his family during the Irish famine years, and was deported to Australia. A claim was made in 1996 that a broadsheet ballad published in the 1880s had similar words; however, the folklorist and researcher John Moulden found no basis to this claim, and Pete St. John stated that he wrote the words as well as the music.

In 1979, the song was recorded by Danny Doyle, reaching the top ten in the Irish Singles Chart.  The song charted again in 1982 for Barleycorn, reaching number seven in Ireland, but the most successful version was released by Paddy Reilly in 1982. While peaking only at number four, it remained in the Irish charts for 72 weeks. Two further versions have since reached the Irish top ten: the Cox Crew getting to number five in 1999, while Dance to Tipperary peaked at number six in 2001.

The lyrics say the convict's crime is that he "stole Trevelyan's corn"; this is a reference to Charles Edward Trevelyan, a senior English civil servant in the administration of the Lord Lieutenant of Ireland in Dublin Castle. Trevelyan famously said, "the judgement of God sent the calamity to teach the Irish a lesson". He believed that the starving Irish could subsist on maize, a grain that they could not afford, and had little knowledge of or experience in preparing. “Corn” could also refer to a multitude of different foods in this case, including oats and barley, as it was used as a general term for grain of all kinds.  This line is also a play on words, since Trevelyan was of Cornish descent.

Sporting anthem
The song was regularly heard from on the terraces in the late 1980s from supporters of the Galway county hurling team. The song was adopted by Republic of Ireland national football team supporters during the 1990 World Cup and subsequently by Celtic supporters in the early 1990s.

Celtic Football Club in Glasgow has a large following in Ireland and among people in Scotland of Irish descent. During the Great Famine in Ireland during the 1840s, 100,000 Irish famine victims emigrated to Glasgow. When Celtic's long-serving Irish goalkeeper Packie Bonner had a testimonial match in 1991, he invited Pete St. John to attend the event and speak to the crowd before the game. St John began by thanking Glasgow for looking after the famine victims, and then began to sing "Fields of Athenry", accompanied by thousands of fans. He later described it as one of the most memorable moments of his life.

The song's popularity, due in part to its use at sporting events, has helped to attract tourists to Athenry. In recognition of this, the town's officials invited Pete St. John to a civic reception and presented him with a mace and chain as a token of their appreciation.

The song is also associated with the Connacht, Munster, London Irish and Ireland rugby union teams. It's also seen by many as Galway's county song, sung at the various GAA matches when the county is playing.

Fans of Cork City F.C.  adopted "The Fields of Bishopstown" to the same tune, with lyrics changed from the original version. It is sung regularly at home games.

"The Fields of Anfield Road" was adopted by Liverpool supporters to the same tune, but with adapted lyrics referencing their history and stadium. The song was used to commemorate the 20th anniversary of the 1989 Hillsborough disaster.

Persija Jakarta's supporters, The Jak Mania also use this song as their chants with the title "Field of GBK" and different lyrics in Indonesian.

At the Beijing Olympics Boxing Final, which featured Irish boxer Kenny Egan, Tom Humphries of The Irish Times noted, "By the time Egan and Zhang emerged the great rhythmic roars of "Zhang! Zhang! Zhang!" competed to drown out the lusty warblings of a large Irish contingent who returned to singing of the problems of social isolation in rural Athenry."

During the UEFA Euro 2012 group stage game against Spain, the Irish fans started singing the song roughly 83 minutes into the game and sang for the last six minutes of regulation, as well as past the full-time whistle, knowing that they were going to be eliminated from the group as they were down by four goals and had failed to accrue the points necessary to remain in the tournament. Some commentators stopped commenting for the final minutes, so the crowd could be heard. This was widely reported in the international media.

Recordings
Other artists to have recorded versions include Michael Jackson, Mary Duff, Máiréad Carlin, Paddy Reilly, Daniel O'Donnell,  Frank Patterson, Ronan Tynan, Brush Shiels, James Galway, The Dubliners, Charlie Haden with daughter Petra Haden, Seanchai & The Unity Squad, Scottish band North Sea Gas, English band Kelda with vocalist Jack Routledge,  US group Shilelagh Law, US punk band No Use for a Name, New Zealanders Hollie Smith and Steve McDonald, Dropkick Murphys, London-Irish band Neck, The Durutti Column, The High Kings, The Irish Tenors, Off Kilter and Kieran Moriarty. It was also recorded by Serbian bands Orthodox Celts and Tir na n'Og, and US Celtic/folk band Scythian. In 2013, it was released by Neil Byrne and Ryan Kelly of Celtic Thunder for their album "Acoustically Irish".

A reggae version of this song was recorded by the Century Steel Band in the early 1990s.

Irish-Londoners, Neck, released a "Psycho-Ceilidh" version of the song as a single in support of the Republic of Ireland national football team during the 2002 FIFA World Cup. Dropkick Murphys recorded two versions of the song: the first, an uptempo rock arrangement, appeared on their 2003 album Blackout; the second was a softer version they recorded specially for the family of Sergeant Andrew Farrar, a United States Marine from the 2nd Military Police Battalion killed January 28, 2005 (his 31st birthday) in Fallujah, Iraq. Farrar was a fan of Dropkick Murphys, and requested that their version of the song be played at his funeral if he were to die in combat. Blaggards blended the song with Johnny Cash's Folsom Prison Blues in a medley called Prison Love Songs. Other punk versions of the song have been recorded by the bands No Use for a Name, The Tossers, and the Broken O'Briens. The Greenland Whalefishers, a Celtic-punk band from Norway, also recorded a version on their Streets Of Salvation CD.
The song was also recorded by Canadian Celtic rock band the Mudmen on their album Another Day released in 2010.
In 2003, then Cape Town based Tom Purcell recorded a haunting a cappella version, that still stands the test of time.

Johnny Logan covered the song on his album, The Irish Connection (2007).

The song appears on the 2012 Bob Brolly album Till We Meet Again.

Welsh folk singer Dafydd Iwan used the tune for his song "Esgair Llyn", a lament on the depopulation of rural Wales. He first recorded it in 1991 and continues to perform it in concert.

The song has been translated to Scottish Gaelic, entitled "Raointean Ath an Rìgh," and was sung by the Scottish singer Iain "Costello" MacIver, from the Isle of Lewis in the Outer Hebrides.

The tune was also used for the hymn by Rachael Doey, “Outside the City Wall”.

In film
The song is sung in the movie Veronica Guerin, by Brian O'Donnell, then aged 11, a street singer in Dublin, although it is credited on the soundtrack as "Bad News". It is also sung a cappella by a female character at a wake in the 1994 film Priest. It also appears in Dead Poets Society, an anachronism, as the film is set in 1959, before the song was written, and 16 Years of Alcohol. An a cappella version of the first verse and chorus can be found during a singing contest judged by Janeane Garofalo in the film The Matchmaker. Cancer Boy, a character in the 1996 film Kids in the Hall: Brain Candy, is briefly shown whistling the tune.

See also
 Irish rebel music
 List of Irish ballads
 Other rugby anthems:
 Flower of Scotland
 Ireland's Call
 Swing Low, Sweet Chariot (sung by England fans)
 Cwm Rhondda (Bread of Heaven) sung by Wales fans.

References

External links

 Pete St John
  Movie appearances

Fields
Australian folk songs
Botany Bay
Celtic F.C. songs
Dropkick Murphys songs
Football songs and chants
Munster Rugby
Ireland national rugby union team songs
Irish-Australian culture
Irish folk songs
Irish songs
Republic of Ireland national football team songs
Songs about Australia
Songs about Ireland
Songs written by Pete St. John
Works about the Great Famine (Ireland)